Susan Lowey (born 22 January 1933 in Vienna) is an American biophysicist researching the structure and function of contractile proteins. She currently teaches in the Department of Molecular Physiology & Biophysics at the University of Vermont and is a fellow of the American Academy of Arts and Sciences as well as the Biophysical Society.

Education 
Lowey received her BA from Barnard College, PhD in Physical Chemistry from Yale University and pursued post-doctoral research at Harvard University on the biochemistry and structure of myosin, a protein involved in muscle contraction.

Career 
Lowey was employed for about a decade at the Children's Cancer Research Foundation and Harvard Medical School. In 1972, Lowey became a faculty member at The Rosenstiel Basic Medical Sciences Research Center, Brandeis University to collaborate with biophysicists. In 1998, Lowey was appointed as a faculty member in the Department of Molecular Physiology & Biophysics at the University of Vermont.

Awards and recognitions 
 1974 Guggenheim Fellowship for Natural Science Recipient.
 1990 Lowey was elected as fellow to the American Academy of Arts and Sciences. 
 1999 Lowey became a fellow of the Biophysical Society.

See also 
 List of Guggenheim Fellowships awarded in 1974

References

External links 
 Susan Lowry's publications at mendeley.com
 Susan Lowey's publications at researcggate.net

Lowey,Susan
Living people
Fellows of the American Academy of Arts and Sciences
1933 births
Barnard College alumni
University of Vermont faculty
Yale University alumni
Brandeis University faculty